The black-banded crake (Laterallus fasciatus) is a species of bird in subfamily Rallinae of family Rallidae, the rails, gallinules, and coots. It is found in Brazil, Colombia, Ecuador, and Peru.

Taxonomy and systematics

The black-banded crake's taxonomy is unsettled. The International Ornithological Committee places it in genus Laterallus. BirdLife International's Handbook of the Birds of the World places it in genus Porzana. The South American Classification Committee of the American Ornithological Society and the Clements taxonomy place it in genus Anurolimnas.

The worldwide taxonomic systems agree that the black-banded crake is monotypic.

Description

The sexes are alike. Adults have a dark horn or blackish bill. Their head, throat, and breast are rufous. Their back, rump, and wings are deep olive-brown, with a light reddish tinge to the inner flight feathers. Their belly, vent, and undertail coverts are cinnamon-rufous with heavy black bars. Their legs and feet are bright coral red. Immatures have a paler head and breast than adults. Their upperparts' olive-brown has a chestnut wash and the barring on their underparts is olive-brown.

Distribution and habitat

The black-banded crake is found in the western Amazon Basin, from southeastern Colombia south through eastern Ecuador to south-central Peru and east into western Brazil. It inhabits humid landscapes with a dense understory such as secondary forest, where it especially favors overgrown agricultural plots in tropical evergreen forest. It also favors thickets of Heliconia and, on river islands, stands of Cecropia. In elevation it is mostly found below  but reaches as high as  locally in Ecuador.

Behavior

Movement

The black-banded crake is a year-round resident throughout its range.

Feeding

The black-banded crake forages on damp ground in dense cover, where it searches for food in leaf litter. Its diet has not been documented but is assumed to be invertebrates and seeds.

Breeding

Almost nothing is known about the black-banded crake's breeding biology. It makes a dome nest of grass with a side entrance.

Vocalization

One author described the black-banded crake's song as "a rubbery, musical trill, deeper and more bubbly than that of [other] Laterallus crakes." The female sings a shorter version of the song than the male.

Status

The IUCN has assessed the black-banded crake as being of Least Concern. It has a large range but its population size and trend are not known. No immediate threats have been identified. Authors describe it as "rare to locally fairly common" in Ecuador and "rare but widespread" in Peru. The species "may even benefit from low levels of human disturbance, taking advantage of edge habitats around small garden plots."

References

black-banded crake
Birds of the Amazon Basin
Birds of the Colombian Amazon
Birds of the Ecuadorian Amazon
Birds of the Peruvian Amazon
black-banded crake
black-banded crake
Taxonomy articles created by Polbot
Taxobox binomials not recognized by IUCN